The Peruvian electoral system has as its mission the planning, organization and execution of elections in Peru, as well as keeping a civil registry. As defined by the Constitution it comprises the following institutions:

 National Jury of Elections (JNE): in charge of overseeing the legality of elections
 National Office of Electoral Processes (ONPE): in charge of organizing elections
 National Registry of Identification and Civil Status (RENIEC): in charge of maintaining a civil registry, as well as record of suffrage eligibility and registration

Elections are held through direct universal suffrage, voting is compulsory for citizens age eighteen through seventy. Members of the Armed Forces and the Police are entitled to vote, but can not be elected.

Notes

External links 
  JNE official site
  ONPE official site
  RENIEC official site

Peru